The Sundown Kid is a 1942 American Western film directed by Elmer Clifton and written by Norman S. Hall. The film stars Don "Red" Barry, Ian Keith, Helen MacKellar, Linda Leighton, Emmett Lynn and Wade Crosby. The film was released on December 28, 1942, by Republic Pictures.

Plot

Cast 
Don "Red" Barry as Red Tracy aka Red Brennan
Ian Keith as J. Richard Spencer
Helen MacKellar as Lucy Randall
Linda Leighton as Lynne Parsons 
Emmett Lynn as Pop Tanner
Wade Crosby as Vince Ganley
Ted Adams as Jim Dawson
Fern Emmett as Mrs. Agnes Peabody
Bud Geary as Henchman Nick
Bob Kortman as Henchman Luke
Kenne Duncan as Henchman

References

External links
 

1942 films
1940s English-language films
American Western (genre) films
1942 Western (genre) films
Republic Pictures films
Films directed by Elmer Clifton
American black-and-white films
1940s American films